Diageo plc is a British multinational alcoholic beverage company, with its headquarters in London, England. It operates from 132 sites around the world.  It is a major distributor of Scotch whisky and other spirits. Distilleries owned by Diageo, produce 40% of all Scotch whisky with over 24 brands, such as Johnnie Walker, J&B and Vat 69

Its leading brands include Johnnie Walker, Guinness, Smirnoff, Baileys liqueur, Captain Morgan rum and Tanqueray and Gordon's gin.

Diageo has a primary listing on the London Stock Exchange and is a constituent of the FTSE 100 Index. It has a secondary listing on the New York Stock Exchange.

Name
Diageo is an invented name that was created by the branding consultancy Wolff Olins in 1997. The name is composed of the Latin word diēs, meaning "day", and the Greek root geo-, meaning "world"; and is meant to reference the company slogan "Celebrating Life, Every Day, Everywhere".

History
Diageo was formed in 1997 from the merger of Guinness plc and Grand Metropolitan. Its creation was driven by the executives Anthony Greener and Philip Yea at Guinness, along with George Bull and John McGrath of Grand Metropolitan. Anthony Greener was the first executive chairman. Shares in Diageo began trading on the London Stock Exchange on 17 December 1997.

Diageo sold Bombay Sapphire gin to Bacardi in 1997.

In 1998, Diageo sold Dewar's scotch whisky to Bacardi.

In 2000, Diageo sold Pillsbury to General Mills. 

In 2001, Diageo acquired the Seagram's spirits and wine businesses.

In 2002, Diageo sold the Burger King fast food restaurant chain to a consortium led by US firm Texas Pacific for US$1.5 billion.

In 2003, Diageo signed a joint venture with tequila brand Jose Cuervo to buy Don Julio Tequila, selling Jose Cuervo a 50 per cent stake for US$100 million.

In February 2011, Diageo agreed to acquire the Turkish liquor company Mey Icki for US$2.1 billion.

In May 2012, Diageo agreed to acquire Ypióca, the largest-selling brand of premium cachaça in Brazil, for £300 million.

In June 2012, Diageo announced a £1 billion investment in Scotch whisky production over the following five years, with at least one new distillery to be constructed, several existing facilities to be expanded, and overall production capacity to be increased by 30 to 40 per cent. This did not, however, involve retaining the original Johnnie Walker plant, in Kilmarnock, which had already closed its doors in March of the same year.

In November 2012, Diageo acquired 53.4 per cent stake in the Indian spirits company United Spirits for £1.28 billion.

Since 2011, Diageo has had a controlling stake in the parent company Sichan Chengdu Shuijingfang Group Company, which it bought outright in 2013.

In November 2014, Diageo agreed to sell Bushmills Irish whiskey to the Beckmann family in exchange for US$408 million and full ownership of tequila brand Don Julio.

In April 2015, Diageo acquired a 100 percent share in South African beer producer United National Breweries (UNB), but it was announced in December 2018 that Diageo had entered into an agreement for the sale of UNB, expected to close in the second half of 2019.

In October 2015, Diageo announced the sale of most of its wine business to Treasury Wine Estates. Other brands, such as Navarro Correas and Chalone Vineyard, were sold separately.

In December 2015, Diageo announced a US$10 million investment in Danish whisky brand Stauning, to facilitate expansion of production.

In March 2016, the company sold Grand Marnier, a cognac and bitter orange-based liqueur, to the Italian beverage company Campari Group.

In February 2017, Diageo announced plans to open a Guinness brewery and tourist attraction in Baltimore County, Maryland. The brewery could potentially host as many as 300,000 visitors per year.

In June 2017, the Casamigos tequila brand – a super-premium US-based tequila, launched in 2013 – became the latest addition to Diageo.

In February 2018, Diageo announced plans for limited edition bottles of its 12-year-old Black Label blended whisky named Jane Walker, as opposed to Johnnie Walker, to be sold. The label featured a striding woman on the label, rather than the top-hatted man normally associated with the brand.

In November 2018, Diageo agreed to sell Seagram's VO, Seagram's 83, Myers's Rum, Popov vodka, Booth's Gin, Goldschläger, Yukon Jack, Sambuca, and 11 other brands to the Sazerac Company for US$550 million.

In February 2019, Diageo increased its stake in Chinese baijiu company Sichuan Shuijingfang Company Limited (SJF) to almost 70% through a partial-tender offer.

In August 2019, Diageo bought the majority stake in Seedlip, a non-alcoholic spirits brand.

In January 2020, Diageo agreed to pay US$5 million to settle charges brought by the US Securities and Exchange Commission that alleged the company had pressured distributors to buy products in excess of demand in order to hit performance goals.

In October 2021, Diageo announced plans to invest $500m to expand its manufacturing in Mexico for the tequila category. Construction of the new facilities in Jalisco, Mexico is expected to begin in 2021.

In September 2022, Diageo sold Archers brand to De Kuyper Royal Distillers.

In October 2022, it was announced Diageo had acquired the Australian cold brew coffee liqueur brand, Mr Black.

In November 2022, it was announced that Diageo would acquire Balcones Distilling, a whiskey distiller based in Texas.

Brands 

Diageo's beverage brands include:

Scotch whisky:
Single malt Scotch whisky: Classic Malts of Scotland, Auchroisk, Benrinnes, Blair Athol, Caol Ila, Cardhu, Clynelish, Cragganmore, Dailuaine, Dalwhinnie, Dufftown, Glendullan, Glenkinchie, Glen Elgin, Glen Spey, Inchgower, Knockando, Lagavulin, Linkwood, Mannochmore, Mortlach, Oban, Royal Lochnagar, Singleton, Strathmill, Talisker, Teaninich. Blended Scotch whisky: Bell's, Black & White, Buchanan's, Johnnie Walker, J&B, Logan, Old Parr, Vat 69, White Horse.

Irish whiskey:
Roe & Co

American whiskey: 
Balcones, Bulleit, George Dickel, Seagram's Seven Crown, 

Canadian whisky: 
Crown Royal, Piehole Whiskey

Brandy:
Cîroc VS

Vodka: 
Cîroc, Ketel One, Smirnoff

Rum: 
Bundaberg, Cacique, Captain Morgan, Pampero, Zacapa

Mixed drinks:
Loyal 9 Cocktails, Smirnoff Cocktails

Liqueur: 
Baileys, Pimm's, Sheridan's, Mr Black

Tequila: 
Casamigos, Don Julio, DeLeón

Gin: 
Aviation Gin, Gilbey's, Gordon's, Tanqueray
 
Various: 
McDowell's

Baijiu: 
Shui Jing Fang

Rakı: 
Altınbaş, Civan Rakı, İzmir Rakısı, Kulüp Rakı, Tayfa Rakı, Tekirdağ Rakısı, Yeni Rakı

Cachaça: 
Ypióca

Beer: 
Guinness, Harp Lager, Hop House 13, Kilkenny, Meta Abo, Rockshore Irish Lager, Senator, Smithwick's, Tusker,  

Cider: 
Rockshore Apple Cider

Hard seltzer: 
Rockshore Hard seltzer

Worldwide 
Diageo operates in 180 countries across five regions: Europe, North America, Latin America, the Caribbean, Asia Pacific and Africa.

Awards and rankings 
In 2016, Diageo was ranked 11th out of 4,255 companies worldwide for diversity and inclusiveness in the Thomson Reuters Diversity and Inclusion (D&I) Index.

Operations 
Diageo also owns a 34% stake in the Moet Hennessy drinks division of French luxury goods company LVMH.

In 2017, the company was awarded top place in the Institute of Directors' and Chartered Quality Institute's Good Governance Index.

Head office
Diageo's head office is in Great Marlborough Street, London after moving from its previous location in Park Royal, London Borough of Brent, on the site of a former Guinness brewery which had closed in 2004 after producing beer since 1936. Diageo's previous head office facility had been located in Henrietta Place, in the Marylebone district of the City of Westminster in London, since 1996. In 2009, Diageo announced that it was closing the Henrietta Place facility as part of a cost reduction programme and moved its employees to the Park Royal site.

Controversies

In December 2003, Diageo provoked controversy over its decision to change its Cardhu brand Scotch whisky from a single malt to a blended malt whilst retaining the original name and bottle style. Diageo took this action because it did not have sufficient reserves to meet demand in the Spanish market, where Cardhu had been successful. After a meeting of producers, Diageo agreed to make changes. In 2006, the Cardhu brand changed back to being a single malt.

In July 2009, Diageo announced that, after nearly 200 years of association with the town of Kilmarnock, Scotland, they would be closing the Johnnie Walker blending and bottling plant as part of a restructuring to the business. This would make 700 workers unemployed and caused outrage from the press, local people, and politicians. A campaign against this decision was launched by the local SNP MSP Willie Coffey and Labour MP Des Browne. A petition was drawn up against the plans, which also involved the closure of the historic Port Dundas grain distillery in Glasgow. The Johnnie Walker plant in Kilmarnock closed its doors in March 2012 and the buildings were subsequently demolished a year later.

In February 2009, it was reported in The Guardian that the company had restructured itself so as to avoid paying tax in the UK.

The National Puerto Rican Coalition planned to run a series of ads in New York City and Puerto Rico urging a boycott of Diageo-owned alcoholic drinks to protest the corporation's production move of its Captain Morgan rum from Puerto Rico to the U.S. Virgin Islands, which will provide it with US$2.7 billion in tax benefits over 30 years.

In 2011, Diageo agreed to pay more than US$16 million to settle U.S. civil regulatory charges that it made improper payments to foreign officials. Regulators accused the British company of violating the U.S. Foreign Corrupt Practices Act through its subsidiaries to obtain lucrative sales and tax benefits for its Johnnie Walker and Windsor Scotch whiskies and other brands.

On 9 May 2012 Scottish craft brewery BrewDog revealed that Diageo had threatened to withdraw funding from the British Institute of Innkeeping Scotland's annual awards if BrewDog was to be named winner of the Best Bar Operator award. Diageo was forced to issue an apology.

In 2015, Diageo released an advertising campaign showing a young girl crying with her makeup smeared as her sister looks at her from the doorway, and the caption, "Who's following in your footsteps? Out of control drinking has consequences". The director of Rape Crisis Network Ireland said Diageo "blames victims of sexual violence for the crimes that have been committed against them. This is a harmful, regressive and hurtful message which targets the vulnerable."

In November 2016, Diageo announced its intention of selling at auction Sir Edwin Landseer's iconic 1851 painting The Monarch of the Glen – which the company owns, but which has been on loan to the National Museum of Scotland in Edinburgh since 1999 – as it has "no direct link to our business or brands". Ian Jack, writing in The Guardian, stated that "any business with a sense of history would give the picture to a public gallery in Scotland, the place without which both the business and the picture would be nothing. It would be a decent thing.

In July 2017, Diageo was accused of using its huge influence over Irish publicans to pressure some based in Cork city into swapping craft beer taps offering Irish-produced craft beer for Diageo beer brands, after several such pubs all did so over the course of one weekend. Diageo denied the accusation.

References

External links

 
British companies established in 1997
Food and drink companies established in 1997
Multinational food companies
Companies listed on the London Stock Exchange
Companies listed on the New York Stock Exchange
Multinational companies headquartered in the United Kingdom